Blue Hawaii is the fourth soundtrack album by the American singer Elvis Presley, released on RCA Victor Records in mono and stereo, LPM/LSP 2426, on October 20, 1961. It is the soundtrack to the 1961 film of the same name starring Presley. In the United States, the album spent 20 weeks at the number one slot and 39 weeks in the Top 10 on Billboards Top Pop LPs chart. It was certified Gold on December 21, 1961, Platinum and 2× Platinum on March 27, 1992, and 3× Platinum on July 30, 2002, by the Recording Industry Association of America. On the US Top Pop Albums chart, Blue Hawaii is second only to the soundtrack of West Side Story as the most successful soundtrack album of the 1960s.

Content 
RCA and Presley's manager, Colonel Tom Parker, had initially planned a schedule of one soundtrack and one popular music release per year for Presley, in addition to the requisite four singles. To coincide with the location of the film, touches of Hawaiian music were included, from instrumentation to the traditional song "Aloha 'Oe". The title song was taken from the 1937 Bing Crosby film Waikiki Wedding, and "Hawaiian Wedding Song" dates from a 1926 operetta.

Recording sessions took place at Radio Recorders in Hollywood on March 21, 22, and 23, 1961. The songs "Can't Help Falling in Love" and "Rock-A-Hula Baby" were pulled off the album for two sides of a single released on November 21, 1961. The A-side "Can't Help Falling in Love," which became the standard closer for a Presley concert in the 1970s, went to number two on the Billboard Hot 100, while the b-side charted independently at number 23.

The success of this soundtrack and its predecessor G. I. Blues, both of which sold in much greater quantity than Presley's two regular releases of the time, Elvis Is Back! and Something for Everybody set the pace for the rest of the decade. Parker and Presley would focus on Elvis' film career, non-soundtrack albums taking a back seat with only six during the 1960s against 16 soundtrack albums among 27 movies and the comeback special. This formula proved disastrous for Presley's career. Popular music was on the threshold of complete renewal and change and Presley became 'lost in Hollywood'.

Critical reception
The Blue Hawaii soundtrack was nominated for a Grammy Award in 1961 in the category of Best Sound Track Album or Recording of Original Cast from a Motion Picture or Television.

Reissues
Blue Hawaii was reissued on compact disc in 1997 and again in 2008.  The latter edition was a deluxe 2-disc release on the Follow That Dream label that featured numerous alternate takes.  It also corrected the error with the 1997 issue that incorrectly reversed the stereo channels.
Five songs from this album appear on the 1995 compendium soundtrack box set Command Performances: The Essential 60s Masters II: "Can't Help Falling in Love", "Rock-a-Hula Baby", "Blue Hawaii," "Hawaiian Wedding Song," and "Beach Boy Blues."

Track listing

Original release

1997 reissue
On April 29, 1997, RCA released a remastered and expanded version for compact disc.  Tracks 1-7 were the seven songs from side one of the original LP and tracks 8-14 were from side two. Tracks 15-22 are bonus tracks, all of which had been recorded during the original album sessions and were previously unreleased except for "Steppin' Out of Line" which had originally appeared on the LP Pot Luck with Elvis (1962).

2008 Blue Hawaii CD reissue

Personnel 
 Elvis Presley – lead vocals
 The Surfers – backing vocals
 The Jordanaires  – backing vocals
 Boots Randolph – saxophone
 George Field – harmonica 
 Freddie Tavares – ukulele
Bernie Lewis – ukulele
 Hank Garland – electric guitar
Tiny Timbrell – acoustic guitar
 Scotty Moore –  electric guitar
 Alvino Rey  – pedal steel guitar
 Floyd Cramer – piano
 Dudley Brooks – piano, celeste
 Bob Moore – double bass
 D.J. Fontana – drums
Bernie Mattinson – drums, percussion
Hal Blaine – drums, percussion

Charts

See also 
 List of Billboard 200 number-one albums of 1961
 List of Billboard 200 number-one albums of 1962
 List of UK Albums Chart number ones of the 1960s

References

External links 

 LPM-2426 Blue Hawaii Guide part of The Elvis Presley Record Research Database
 LSP-2426 Blue Hawaii Guide part of The Elvis Presley Record Research Database

Albums produced by Steve Sholes
1961 soundtrack albums
Elvis Presley soundtracks
RCA Victor soundtracks
Musical film soundtracks
Comedy film soundtracks